Free agriculturalists (literally, free ploughmen) were a category of peasants in the Russian Empire in 19th century.

As the title of the decree says, the serf were freed and endowed with land by the will on the serf owner under certain conditions: payment or obligations to carry out certain works. During the reign of Alexander I only about 7,300 male peasants (with families) or about 0.5% of serfs were freed.

References

19th century in the Russian Empire
Economy of the Russian Empire
Society of the Russian Empire
Reform in Russia